Kristian Hellström (24 July 1880 – 14 June 1946) was a Swedish middle-distance runner and a sports administrator. He competed at the 1906 Intercalated Games in the 800 m and 1500 m events and finished in fifth and third place respectively. At the 1908 Summer Olympics, he failed to reach the final of the 800 m event.

Nationally, he won the 1500 m title in 1900 and 1901, as well as the 10,000 m title in 1902. He was also the German champion for the 1500 m in 1905.

Hellström was a prolific sports administrator who founded his first sports club, IF Sleipner Stockholm, in 1897 at age 17. In 1901, he launched the first cross-country race in Sweden. In 1912, Hellström became Secretary-General of the Organizing Committee of the Stockholm Olympics. He was also a founding member of the International Association of Athletics Federations (IAAF), becoming its first Secretary-General from 1913 to 1914.

References

Further reading
 
 
 

1880 births
1946 deaths
Swedish male middle-distance runners
Olympic athletes of Sweden
Medalists at the 1906 Intercalated Games
Athletes (track and field) at the 1906 Intercalated Games
Athletes (track and field) at the 1908 Summer Olympics
Athletes from Stockholm